Sari Beygluy-e Araliq (also Romanized as Sārī Beyglūy-e Ārālīq; also known as Sārī Beyglar-e Ārāleq and Sārī Beyglū-ye Ārāleq) is a village in Bash Qaleh Rural District, in the Central District of Urmia County, West Azerbaijan Province, Iran. At the 2006 census, its population was 145, in 40 families.

References 

Populated places in Urmia County